Aybasanlı or Aybasanly may refer to:
Aşağı Aybasanlı, Azerbaijan ("Lower Aybasanlı")
Yuxarı Aybasanlı, Azerbaijan ("Upper Aybasanlı")